Richard Snetisham was an English medieval churchman and university Chancellor.

Snetisham was Chancellor of the University of Oxford during 1414–15. He was an "excellent disputant and expounder of the scriptures".

References

Year of birth unknown
Year of death unknown
English theologians
Chancellors of the University of Oxford
14th-century English people
15th-century English people
15th-century Roman Catholics